Mabool: The Story of the Three Sons of Seven is the third full-length studio album by the Israeli metal band Orphaned Land. It was released on February 23, 2004 through Century Media Records. There are two different versions of the album; in a CD version and an LP with different cover art for each. The album is also available as a limited edition version with a bonus live acoustic CD titled The Calm Before the Flood. It was also released on vinyl by Profound Lore Records as a 2-LP album in a clear wax case limited to only 500 copies. The album also features two videos that were made for "Ocean Land" and "Norra el Norra", the band's first videos. Mabool is Orphaned Land's second concept album.

The album was made in a highly arranged fashion and took six years to be arranged, composed and produced and is therefore the main reason for the long wait between albums.

Synopsis
The album tells the story of three sons (angels) of the seventh (in the mythology the number seven refers to God). The seventh was divided into three, representing the divide of the Abrahamic religion into three main streams: Judaism, Islam and Christianity.

Each angel was given a power and representation. The first angel is Judaism; he is represented by a Star of David and his power is magic. The second angel is Islam; he is represented by a half of moon and his power was his strength. The third angel is Christianity; he is represented by the cross and his power is his wisdom.

God had forbidden the angels from reuniting because of fear of their strength. Ignoring the divine order, the angels united into one angel, who immediately got exiled from heaven to earth and was divided into three again, sentenced to fight each other until they can prove themselves and get back into heaven.

The angels then try to convince humanity to stop their sins and warn them of a coming flood as punishment if they do not. The album describes the journey of the three, their convincing, and in the end, their failure.

Reception

As of March 8, 2020, Mabool has a rating of 8.85 based on 738 votes on Metal Storm. This average ranks the album as the 4th best record of 2004 and the 96th best album of all time on Metal Storm.

Track listing
 "Birth of the Three (The Unification)" – 6:57
 "Ocean Land (The Revelation)" – 4:43
 "The Kiss of Babylon (The Sins)" – 7:23
 "A'salk" – 2:05
 "Halo Dies (The Wrath of God)" – 7:29
 "A Call to Awake (The Quest)" – 6:10
 "Building the Ark" – 5:02
 "Norra el Norra (Entering the Ark)" – 4:24
 "The Calm Before the Flood" – 4:25
 "Mabool (The Flood)" – 6:59
 "The Storm Still Rages Inside" – 9:20
 "Rainbow (The Resurrection)" – 3:01

The Calm Before the Flood track listing:
 "The Evil Urge" – 3:28
 "A Never Ending Way" – 3:14
 "Mercy" (Paradise Lost cover from One Second) – 3:46
 "The Beloved's Cry" – 6:42
 "The Orphaned's Medley" – 9:33

Personnel

Band members
 Kobi Farhi – vocals, backing vocals, death growls, chants, spoken reading
 Yossi Saharon (Sasi) – lead guitar, clean guitars, acoustic guitars, classic guitars, saz, bouzouki, oud, solos on tracks 1, 5, 6, 7, and 11.
 Matti Svatitzki – rhythm guitar, clean guitars, acoustic guitars, solos on tracks 2 and 5.
 Uri Zelcha – bass, fretless bass
 Eden Rabin – keyboards, synthesizers, piano

Session members and guest musicians
 Avi Diamond – drums
 Avi Agababa – percussion
 Shlomit Levi – Yemenite female vocals

Oriental choir
 David Sassi
 Avi Ratzon
 Yariv Malka
 Kobi Farhi
 Yossi Sassi
 Eden Rabin
 Erez Caspi

Moran ensemble
 Tali Ketzef
 Neta Gev
 Neta Kirschenbaum
 Michal Front
 Yael Front
 Naama Aharony
 Reut Venforero
 Noa Kalush
 Liad Dahari
 Rachel Reuven
 Yair Goren
 Yair Polishuk
 Eden Rabin
 Kobi Farhi
 Yossi Sassi

Production and other
 All music composed between the years 1997 and 2003 by Yossi Sassi, Matti Svatizki, Eden Rabin, Kobi Farhi, and Uri Zalcha (except song 8 – Egyptian Traditional).
 Additional composition on songs 1, 5, 6, 10 by Sami Bachar.
 Production management and arrangements by Kobi Farhi with the help of all Orphaned Land members.
 Recording Engineer: Erez Caspi
 Additional Recording Engineer: Simon Vinestock, Daniel Ya'ari
 Assistant Engineer: Marselo David Kovalsky, Rafi Nahmias
 "Moazin" (end of song 2) were sung and recorded secretly in Taj Mahal, India by Kobi Farhi.
 Intro and Thunders were recorded by Kobi Farhi in India and Israel.

Concept and lyrics
 Kobi Farhi and Alon Miasnikov
 Additional lyrics by Eden Rabin
 All Hebrew and Latin texts (songs 5, 7, 11) taken from the Book of Genesis (Flood Story).
 Hebrew and Yemen texts (songs 3, 4) taken from Rabbi Shalom Shabazi's (1619–1720) poems and from "Halel" praising song (song 8).

References

External links
  at Orphaned Land official site
 
 

2004 albums
Concept albums
Orphaned Land albums
Century Media Records albums
Profound Lore Records albums